Passive leg raise, also known as shock position, is a treatment for shock or a test to evaluate the need for further fluid resuscitation in a critically ill person. 

The purpose of the position is to elevate the legs above the heart in a manner that will help blood flow to the heart.

This test involves raising the legs of a person's (without their active participation), which causes gravity to pull blood from the legs, thus increasing circulatory volume available to the heart (cardiac preload) by around 150-300 milliliters, depending on the amount of venous reservoir. The real-time effects of this maneuver on hemodynamic parameters such as blood pressure and heart rate are used to guide the decision whether or not more fluid will be beneficial. The assessment is easier when invasive monitoring is present (such as an arterial catheter).

The maneuver might be reinforced in a clinical setting by moving the patient's bed from a semi-recumbent (half sitting, half laying down) position to a recumbent (laying down) position with the legs raised. This is theorised to cause an additional mobilisation of blood from the gastrointestinal circulation.  Direct measurement of cardiac output is the more reliable comparing to the measurement of blood pressure or pulse pressure because of pulse pressure amplification during this procedure. Cardiac output can be measured by arterial pulse contour analysis, echocardiography, esophageal Doppler, or contour analysis of the volume clamp-derived arterial pressure. Any bronchial secretions must be aspirated before performing this test. The legs should not be elevated manually because it may provoke pain, discomfort, or awakening that can cause adrenergic stimulation, giving false readings of cardiac output by increasing heart rate. After the maneuver, the bed should be placed back into semi-recumbent position with cardiac output measured again.  The cardiac output should return to the values measured before the initiation of this maneuver. This test can be used to assess fluid responsiveness without any fluid challenge, where the latter can lead to fluid overload. Compression stockings should be removed before the test so that adequate volume of blood will return to the heart during the maneuver. The physiology of assessing fluid responsiveness via passive leg raise requires increasing systemic venous return without altering cardiac function - a form of functional hemodynamic monitoring.

Several studies showed that this measure is a better predictor of response to rapid fluid loading than other tests such as respiratory variation in pulse pressure or echocardiographic markers.

Placing the person in the Trendelenburg position, does not work since bloodvessels are highly compliant, and expand as result of the increased volume locally. More suitable would be the use of vasopressors.

References

See also
Trendelenburg position

Intensive care medicine
Dehydration